Ralph H. Miller (March 9, 1919 – May 15, 2001) was an American college basketball coach, a head coach for 38 years at three universities: Wichita (now known as Wichita State), Iowa, and Oregon State. Prior to his final season, he was enshrined in the Basketball Hall of Fame on  Miller played college football and basketball at the University of Kansas. His performance on the football team led to him being drafted in the 1942 NFL Draft, but he chose to serve in the military instead of playing in the NFL.

Early life
Born and raised in Chanute, Kansas,  Miller was a standout athlete in high school and college.  At Chanute High School, he won letters in football, track, basketball, golf and tennis. Miller was an all-state basketball player for three years and set the state record in the low hurdles in 1937.  He was all-state three consecutive years in football and basketball.

In college at the University of Kansas in Lawrence, Miller won three letters as a football quarterback and three in basketball.  By 1940, he was beating the 1932 gold medalist in the decathlon Jim Bausch in seven of ten events.

As an undergraduate, he was coached by the legendary Phog Allen. In one of Miller's classes, a guest lecturer was Dr. James Naismith, the inventor of basketball.  Miller was also a member of Phi Kappa Psi Fraternity 

He earned a bachelor's degree in physical education in 1942. He also drafted in the 18th round (167th overall selection) of the 1942 NFL Draft by the Brooklyn Dodgers, but declined playing in the NFL and instead took a personnel department job with the Aero Parts Manufacturing Company. When the company formed the Wichita Aero Commandos football team in 1942, Miller became the starting quarterback. Miller later joined the Army Air Forces for three years, leaving as a first lieutenant.

Miller's first coaching position was at Mount Oread High School in Lawrence, and the team consisted primarily of professors' sons.  The season did not go well and left a sour taste in his mouth towards coaching basketball.

Miller didn't have to go overseas during World War II because of knee problems that began at KU.  He enlisted in the Air Force and held desk jobs in Florida, Texas, and California.  After the war, he became an assistant director of recreation and oversaw a swimming pool and playground in Redlands, California.  Soon, he joined a friend in the business of hauling fruit.

In 1949, eight years after his ill-fated first attempt at coaching, a friend from Wichita named Fritz Snodgrass sent Miller a telegram asking if he might be interested in returning to guide his son's team at East High School.  At East, Miller became a student of the game.  He was fascinated by the full-court press zone defense that had been developed at Kansas in 1930, but he wondered why it was only used after a basket was made.  Nobody could give Miller a solid answer, and so he began tinkering with ways to press after missed shots, too.  His idea was to assign each player a man to guard, and when an errant shot went up, they were immediately to pick up their man.  His ideas were very successful.  In three years at East High, Miller's teams finished second, third and first in the state using his system of execution and pressure basketball.

College coaching

University of Wichita 
In 1951, the president of the University of Wichita (now Wichita State University) offered him a job.  Miller spent 13 years at Wichita, winning 220 games, earning three NIT berths and a spot in the NCAA tournament in 1964.

University of Iowa
In the spring of 1964, Miller left for the University of Iowa of the Big Ten Conference, where he built one of the greatest offensive juggernauts in NCAA history. In his first season he coached Jimmy Rodgers who would go on to be a notable coach in his own right.  The Hawkeyes averaged more than 100 points a game in Big Ten play in 1970 and went undefeated (14–0) in the Big Ten with a  regular season record. Entering the NCAA tournament, Iowa was on a sixteen-game winning streak and played their first game in the Sweet Sixteen, but were upset by independent  the eventual national runner-up. After a consolation win over Notre Dame, the Hawkeyes finished at  overall.

Oregon State University
A month later in April 1970, Miller was offered the job at Oregon State after Paul Valenti stepped  Miller had only two losing seasons in 19 years at OSU, and retired as the second winningest head coach in Oregon State history with 359 victories, behind Slats Gill.

Retirement
Miller retired at age 70 in 1989, his final regular season win was a comfortable one, over rival Oregon at a sold-out Gill Coliseum on Sunday,   The Beavers lost to top-ranked Arizona in the semifinals of the Pac-10 tourney, then fell in the first round of the NCAA tournament to Evansville 

Miller's teams actually won 674 games, but the total was reduced by forfeits because one of his players, Lonnie Shelton, had signed with an agent while still in college in 1976.

The floor of Gill Coliseum is named Ralph Miller Court, and the street in front of the venue was renamed Ralph Miller Drive shortly upon his retirement.

Personal life
In the fall of 1937 at the University of Kansas, Miller took a physiology class where the students were seated alphabetically.  Next to him was an attractive co-ed from Topeka named Emily Jean Milam; five years later they were married. The couple had two sons, Ralph Jr. and Paul, and two daughters, Susan Langer and 

The gymnasium at Chanute High School is named after Miller, and is home to the Ralph Miller Classic, an eight-team tournament.

Miller had an unequaled addiction to cigarettes, and chain-smoked More brand cigarettes during practices, on team buses, and in 

A dozen years after his retirement, Miller died in his sleep at age 82 at his home at Black Butte Ranch, northwest  He had suffered from congestive heart failure and complications  His wife Jean died at age 93 in 2014

Head coaching record

* 15 wins were forfeited and official record for that season is 3–24
** 1 NCAA Tournament loss was vacated
*** 2 NCAA Tournament wins and 1 loss were vacated
**** Official record with vacated and forfeited wins and losses

See also

 List of college men's basketball coaches with 600 wins

References

External links
 

1919 births
2001 deaths
American football quarterbacks
American men's basketball players
Basketball coaches from Kansas
Basketball players from Kansas
College men's basketball head coaches in the United States
High school basketball coaches in the United States
Iowa Hawkeyes men's basketball coaches
Kansas Jayhawks football players
Kansas Jayhawks men's basketball players
Naismith Memorial Basketball Hall of Fame inductees
Oregon State Beavers men's basketball coaches
People from Chanute, Kansas
Wichita State Shockers men's basketball coaches